Sex in Public is an American reality television series that premiered on October 2, 2015, on TLC. The series is hosted by sex therapist Jill Dictrow who goes undercover in various places in order to approach people and help them dealing with their personal problems related to sex and dating.

Despite its title, the series does not actually deal with situations related to public sex itself, but rather confronts people who are not comfortable openly discussing their sex lives.

Due to its inappropriate content, the series was disapproved by the Parents Television Council, which criticised the network's programming decisions and described the show as "a desperate move to attract attention."

Episodes

References

External links 
 
 

2010s American reality television series
2015 American television series debuts
English-language television shows
TLC (TV network) original programming
Sex education television series